Eternal Summer is a 2015 Swedish drama film directed by Andreas Öhman.

Synopsis
When Isak and Em meet one night in Stockholm, they set out on a road trip up to Luleå. Soon, the couple's money ends and they are forced to commit crimes in order to move forward. The crimes are becoming more serious and more violent as they go on. Eventually, they are followed by the police and the trip ends in a tragedy on the Kalix River (Kalixälven).

Cast 
 Madeleine Martin - Em
 Filip Berg - Isak
 Torkel Petersson - Lars, Isak's father
 Fanny Ketter - Felicia
 Mats Qviström - August, Em's father
 Mina Azarian - Em's mother
 Hedda Stiernstedt - Alexia
 Lars T. Johansson - The Hunter

References

External links 

2015 drama films
2015 films
Swedish drama films
2010s Swedish-language films
Films directed by Andreas Öhman
2010s Swedish films